After-acquired property has multiple meanings in law.

Real property

In other areas of law
The term "after-acquired property" also arises in the context of bankruptcy, secured transactions, and the law of wills.  In this context, "after-acquired property" is simply property which is acquired by a borrower after a security agreement is signed, by a debtor after a bankruptcy case is commenced, or by a testator after a will is made.

In the case of secured transactions, whether the after acquired property becomes part of the collateral pledged by the borrower is dependent upon both the language of the security agreement and § 9-204 of the Uniform Commercial Code.

References

Real property law
Legal terminology